Vittorini is a surname. Notable people with the surname include:

Domenico Vittorini (1892–1958), Italian writer and academic
Elio Vittorini (1908–1966), Italian writer and novelist
Fabio Vittorini (born 1971), Italian academic and literary critic

Italian-language surnames